Jaya bin Rajid (1925 – 18 October 2009) was a nobleman and the first Brunei local to be appointed as Brunei's Commissioner of the Royal Brunei Police Force (RBPF) and appointed as the Brunei High Commissioner to several countries.

Career 
He became the first Brunei police personnel to be sent to United Kingdom in 1956. He was also an appointed member of Brunei Privy Council also a Member of Brunei's Royal Succession Council (Majlis Mesyuarat Mengangkat Raja). In 1963, the acting Head of the Religious Affairs Department awarded the Order of Setia Negara Brunei to Police Superintendent Jaya. On 30 January 1967, he was elected as the deputy commissioner of police, and later was again bestowed the Family Order of Seri Utama by then Sultan Omar Ali Saifuddien III on 9 August. 

He was the Bruneian High Commissioner to the London, United Kingdom, Paris, France in 1985, and to Kuala Lumpur, Malaysia, and Ambassador to Bangkok, Thailand in October 1990. On 30 October 1990, he made a credential speech to the King of Thailand, Bhumibol Adulyadej.

Death 
Jaya bin Rajid passed away at Raja Isteri Pengiran Anak Saleha Hospital, Bandar Seri Begawan at 05:45 on 18 October 2009. Funeral was immediately carried out later that morning at Kampong Sungai Tilong and the State Mufti Abdul Aziz Juned carried out prayers. Both the Sultan Hassanal Bolkiah and Crown Prince Al-Muhtadee Billah offered their final respects before he was finally buried at the Kubah Makam Di Raja.

Honours 
He was bestowed the tile "YAM Pengiran Setia Raja" on March 18, 1969, and also received other titles such as "Dato Laila Utama", DK and "Dato Seri Utama" and other awards (DHPNB, PHBS, QPM, CPM, PJK, Pingat Perjuangan, PKLP, Pingat Puspa and Pingat Polls Diraja) of recognition during his lifetime service to the Brunei government.

  Order of Setia Negara Brunei Second Class (DSNB) – Dato Setia (1963)
  Family Order of Seri Utama (DK) – Dato Seri Utama (9 August 1967)
  Order of Pahlawan Negara Brunei Second Class (DHPNB) – Dato Hamzah Pahlawan
  Sultan Hassanal Bolkiah Medal First (PHBS) – (1968)
  Meritorious Service Medal – (PJK)
  Queen's Police Medal – (QPM)
  Colonial Police Medal – (CPM)

References

High Commissioners of Brunei to the United Kingdom
High Commissioners of Brunei to Malaysia
Ambassadors of Brunei to France
Ambassadors of Brunei to Thailand
Bruneian police officers
Bruneian royalty